Travis Wilson (born February 11, 1984) is a former American football wide receiver in the National Football League for the Cleveland Browns, Denver Broncos and Dallas Cowboys. He was drafted by the Cleveland Browns in the third round of the 2006 NFL Draft. He played college football at Oklahoma.

Early years
Wilson attended Creekview High School. As a junior, he had 27 receptions for 400 yards and 7 touchdowns.

As a senior, he was rated as one of the nation's top 25 receivers, setting school single-season records with 42 catches for 1,098 yards (26.1 avg.) and fourteen touchdowns. He also was a cornerback, making 17 tackles and 4 interceptions. He returned five kickoffs for 166 yards, including an 87-yard kickoff return for a touchdown and a 77-yard punt return for a touchdown.

He also practiced track and basketball.

College career
Wilson accepted a football scholarship from the University of Oklahoma. As a freshman, he played in 8 games, making 5 receptions for 50 yards (10.0-yard avg.) and one touchdown.

As a sophomore, he appeared in 14 games with 2 starts. He had 25 receptions for 295 yards (11.8-yard avg.) and 4 touchdowns.

As a junior, he had a breakout season, playing in 13 games with 8 starts. He registered 50 receptions (thirteenth in school history) for 660 yards (13.2-yard avg.), 11 touchdown receptions (second in school history) and 9 kickoff returns for 135 yards.

As a senior, he suffered a mid-season injury that limited him to 25 receptions for 310 yards (12.4-yard avg.), one touchdown, 2 carries for 61 yards, one rushing touchdown and 9 kickoff returns for 168 yards (18.7-yard avg.).

Despite sharing time with three other future NFL receivers -- Mark Clayton, Mark Bradley, and Brandon Jones, he finished his career as one of the top receivers in school history, with 105 receptions (eighth in school history) for 1,315 yards (thirteenth in school history) and 17 touchdowns (second in school history) in 42 games; he started 17. He returned 18 kicks for 303 yards, and rushed for 77 yards, scoring one touchdown. He was a University Studies major.

Professional career

Cleveland Browns
Wilson was selected by the Cleveland Browns in the third round (78th overall) in the 2006 NFL Draft. His draft preparation with IMG was chronicled in the film Two Days in April.  He made his NFL debut in the third game of the season against the Baltimore Ravens on September 24, 2006. Wilson played in his second NFL game versus the Ravens on December 17, catching one pass for 16 yards. He played his third game against the Tampa Bay Buccaneers on December 24, but did not receive any passes. The next week, Wilson started his first game against the Houston Texans on December 31, catching one more pass for another 16-yard gain. He appeared in 4 games (one start), making 2 receptions for 32 yards (16.0-yard avg.). He was declared inactive in 9 contests and was active but did not play in 3 others.

In 2007, he was declared inactive in all 16 regular season games. He was released on August 31, 2008.

Denver Broncos
On September 1, 2008, he was signed by the Denver Broncos to the practice squad. He was released on September 23.

Dallas Cowboys
On October 1, 2008, he was signed to the Dallas Cowboys practice squad after wide receiver Mike Jefferson was suspended four games. After finishing the season on the team's practice squad, he was re-signed to a future contract on December 31. He was subsequently waived injured (knee) on July 28, 2009 and reverted to injured reserve. He was released with an injury settlement on September 3.

References

1984 births
Living people
American football wide receivers
Cleveland Browns players
Dallas Cowboys players
Denver Broncos players
Oklahoma Sooners football players
People from Carrollton, Texas
Players of American football from Texas
Sportspeople from the Dallas–Fort Worth metroplex